Yatsenyuk Government may refer to
 First Yatsenyuk government, created following the aftermath of the 2014 Ukrainian revolution, active February–November 2014
 Second Yatsenyuk government, created after the conclusion of the 2014 Ukrainian parliamentary election, active since December 2014

See also
 2014 Ukrainian revolution
 Arseniy Yatsenyuk